Gandarpur is a village located in the northern part of the district of Khordha in the Indian state of Odisha. In 2011, the population was 3,109 persons in 606 households.

Geography 
The village is situated on the west bank of Kuakhai River.Village West side New Bhubaneswar Railway Station

Government 
An elected sarpanch administrates the village.

Culture 
Khandayat cast people are there living

Raja (festival) Durga poja   ଏଠାରେ ଧୁୁୁମ ଧାମ ରେ ପାଳନ କରାଯାଏ। Lakshmi Puja  ମାଣ ବସା ଗୁରୁବାର Kartikeyapuja Durga Puja ବଡ଼ ଓଷା ପାଳନ କରାଯାଏ ।

Temples 
 Maa Mangala, Dula Dei, Durga Temple
 Laxmi Narayan Temple
 Nitai Gouri Temple
 Maa Jhamu Mangala Temple
 Maa Kateni Mangala Temple
 Maa Mangala Temple
 Sai Samantha Temple

Sports 
 Shastiji Club
 Shine Star Club
 United youth sports club
 Kalinga Yuva Bikash Parishad

Schools 
• Sri Aurobinda Bidyapitha Gandarpur

 Bhagat Ghara (ଅଖାଡା ଘର)
 Gandarpur primary school
 Saraswati sishu bidya mandira

This article edited

References

External links 
 

Villages in Khordha district